Saint Helena Island may refer to:

Saint Helena, in the South Atlantic Ocean
St. Helena Island, Maryland
St. Helena Island (Michigan)
Saint Helena Island (South Carolina)
St Helena Island, Queensland, Australia